Amblyseius lianshanus is a species of mite in the family Phytoseiidae.

References

lianshanus
Articles created by Qbugbot
Animals described in 1980